Alphitophagus bifasciatus is a species of beetle belonging to the family Tenebrionidae.

It has almost cosmopolitan distribution.

References

Tenebrionidae